Terra Linda may refer to:
Terra Linda, San Rafael, California
Terra Linda High School